Ćosić is a Bosnian, Croatian and Serbian surname. It may refer to:

 Aleksandar Ćosić (1922-?), Yugoslav sprinter
 Bora Ćosić (born 1932), Yugoslav writer
 Božidar Ćosić (born 1982), Serbian professional footballer
 Dobrica Ćosić (1921–2014), Serbian politician, writer
 Ivan Ćosić (handballer) (born 1986), Croatian handballer
 Ivan Ćosić (footballer) (born 1989), Croatian-German footballer
 Ivan Ćosić (volleyball), Croatian volleyball player
 Krešimir Ćosić (1948–1995), Croatian basketball player
 Krešimir Ćosić Cup, the national basketball cup of Croatia
 Krešimir Ćosić Hall, multi-use indoor arena in Zadar, Croatia
 Krešimir Ćosić (born 1949), Croatian soldier and politician
 Ljubiša Ćosić (born 1979), Bosnian Serb politician
 Marko Ćosić (born 1994), Croatian footballer
 Miro Ćosić (born 1983), Bosnian biathlete
 Sarah Ćosić (born 1989), Croatian model
 Uroš Ćosić (born 1992), Serbian footballer
 Vuk Ćosić (born 1966), Serbian computer artist
 Zlatko Ćosić (born 1972), Bosnia and Herzegovina experimental filmmaker and video artist
 Zoran Ćosić (born 1963), Bosnian biathlete

See also 
 Köse

References 

Bosnian surnames
Croatian surnames
Serbian surnames